The State Electricity Commission of Western Australia (known by its acronym SEC) was a government owned and managed Western Australia energy provider. 

It was established in 1945.

It saw the introduction of piped gas into the south west of the state, as well as other infrastructure developments in its time.

It was changed in 1975 to the State Energy Commission of Western Australia and reorganized in 2006 into Western Power, Synergy, Alinta, Verve Energy and  Horizon Power.

References

External links
 Australian Science at Work - State Electricity Commission of Western Australia (1945 - 1975)

Energy in Western Australia
Defunct government agencies of Western Australia